Sadowiec-Niwa  is a village in the administrative district of Gmina Działoszyn, within Pajęczno County, Łódź Voivodeship, in central Poland.

The village has a population of 60.

References

Sadowiec-Niwa